The Crop Research Institute (CRI; previously, Research Institute of Crop Production) was established in 1951. During its 60-year existence, the CRIhas been the leading crop-production research institution within the Czech Republic. After most specialised research institutes in the Czech Republic were privatised in 1993, GRI remained the only state-independent institution pursuing both research and consulting activities focussed on problems associated with growing crop plants.

The CRI is a subsidised organisation. Its basic purpose is the development of scientific knowledge in the field of integrated crop production, the production of wholesome foodstuffs, and the development of conditions for sustainable agriculture and conservation of the environment.

Although the main CRI office is in Prague, various parts of the institute (14  experimental or research stations and separate laboratories) are located in different areas in the territory of the Czech Republic.

References

External links
CRI Website

Research institutes in the Czech Republic
Agricultural research institutes
Agriculture in the Czech Republic
Research institutes established in 1951
1951 establishments in Czechoslovakia